Polls leading up to the 2008 Canadian federal election.

Graphical summary

Polls 

The dates listed are normally the date the survey was concluded.  Most news and political affairs sources use the convention of using the last date that the poll was conducted in order to establish the inclusion/exclusion of current events.

Leadership polls
Aside from conducting the usual opinion surveys on general party preferences, polling firms also survey public opinion on who would make the best Prime Minister:

Sometimes the information is further broken down, as in this Strategic Counsel poll conducted from February 15 to February 18, 2007:

The Strategic Counsel also conducts occasional polls of the overall impression of the party leaders: favourable or not favourable (favourable percentage shown).

See also 
 2008 Canadian federal election
 Opinion polling in the Canadian federal election, 2006
 Opinion polling in the Canadian federal election, 2011
 Opinion polling in the Canadian federal election, 2015

References

External links
Projections and predictions
Election Prediction Project
Hill and Knowlton election predictor
LISPOP – Projected distribution of seats

2008 general election
2008 Canadian federal election
Canada